Hensleytown is an unincorporated community in Christian County, Kentucky, United States.

References

Unincorporated communities in Christian County, Kentucky
Unincorporated communities in Kentucky